Iowa Territory's at-large congressional district is an obsolete congressional district that encompassed the area of the Iowa Territory, which was split off from the Wisconsin Territory in 1838. After Iowa's admission to the Union as the 29th state by act of Congress on December 28, 1846, this district was dissolved and replaced by Iowa's at-large congressional district.

List of delegates representing the district 
On June 12, 1838, an act of Congress gave Iowa Territory the authority to elect a delegate to Congress.

See also
Iowa's congressional districts

References

External links 

Former congressional districts of the United States
At-large United States congressional districts
Territory At-large